227th Aviation Regiment is a aviation regiment of the United States Army, mostly associated with the 1st Cavalry Division.

Structure

 1st Battalion "Attack"
 2nd Battalion "Lobos"
 Company C "DUSTOFF" (UH-60)
 3rd Battalion "SpearHead"

References

227